The 2018 League1 Ontario season was the fourth season of play for the Women's Division of League1 Ontario, a Division 3 semi-professional soccer league in the Canadian soccer pyramid and the highest level of soccer based in the Canadian province of Ontario. Durham United FA won the league championship after beating the previously undefeated FC London and Woodbridge Strikers in the playoffs.

Changes from 2017 
The women's division grew from 11 to 13 teams, with the addition of women's side from the Oakville Blue Devils, as well as Hamilton United (representing the league's first entry from that city) and DeRo United FC (an academy run by former national team player Dwayne De Rosario). Sanjaxx Lions did not field a team in the women's division for this season.

Teams

Regular season 
Each team plays 12 matches as part of the season; one match against all other teams.  The top four teams advance to the playoffs to determine the league champion.

Playoffs 
The top four teams from the regular season earn entry into the playoffs, which consists of a single knockout phase containing two semifinals and a final.

Semifinals

Final

Cup 
The cup tournament is a separate contest from the rest of the season, in which all thirteen teams from the women's division take part.  It is not a form of playoffs at the end of the season (as is typically seen in North American sports), but is more like the Canadian Championship or the FA Cup, albeit only for League1 Ontario teams.  All matches are separate from the regular season and are not reflected in the season standings.

The cup tournament is a single-match knockout tournament with four total rounds culminating in a final match in the start of August, with initial matchups determined by random draw.  Each match in the tournament must return a result; any match drawn after 90 minutes will advance directly to kicks from the penalty mark instead of extra time.

Statistics

Top goalscorers 

Updated to matches played on August 21, 2018.  Source:

Top goalkeepers 

Updated to matches played on August 21, 2018.  Minimum 360 minutes played.  Source:

Awards 
The following players received honours in the 2018 season:

 First Team All-Stars

 Second Team All-Stars

 Third Team All-Stars

References

External links 

League1 W
League1 Ontario (women) seasons